Nadole may refer to the following places:
Nadole, Łódź Voivodeship (central Poland)
Nadole, Pomeranian Voivodeship (north Poland)
Nadole, Subcarpathian Voivodeship (southeast Poland)
Nadole, Žetale, a settlement in the Municipality of Žetale in eastern Slovenia